Comores Aviation International (Compagnie Aérienne de l'Union des iles Comores) is the flag carrier of the Comoros. It is privately owned and operates domestic scheduled services, as well as charters mainly to tourist destinations in southern and eastern Africa. Its main base is Prince Said Ibrahim International Airport, Moroni, with a hub at Ouani Airport.

History 
The airline was established in 1996 and started operations in 1997. It is owned by Jean-Marc Heintz (President) (70%) and Batouli Heintz (General Manager) (30%) and has 82 employees (at March 2007).

Destinations 
Comores Aviation operates scheduled services to the following destinations (as of March 2009):
Comoros:
Anjouan (Ouani Airport) Secondary Hub
Moroni (Prince Said Ibrahim International Airport) Hub
French Overseas Collectivity (Mayotte)
Dzaoudzi (Dzaoudzi Pamandzi International Airport)
Madagascar 
Antananarivo (Ivato Airport)
Mahajanga (Amborovy Airport)
Tanzania
Dar Es Salaam (Julius Nyerere International Airport)
Zanzibar (Kisauni Airport)

Fleet 
The Comores Aviation fleet includes the following aircraft (at March 2009):

1 Embraer 120
2 Let Turbolet 410
3 BAe 146-200

Previously operated
At August 2006 the airline also operated:
1 BAe 748 Series 2B (leased from Executive Aerospace of South Africa)

References

External links

Official website 

Airlines of the Comoros
Airlines established in 1996
Moroni, Comoros
1996 establishments in the Comoros